Jalgaon City Assembly constituency is one of the 288 Vidhan Sabha constituencies of Maharashtra state in western India.

Overview
Jalgaon City (constituency number 13) is one of the 11 Vidhan Sabha constituencies located in Jalgaon district. This constituency covers Jalgaon Municipal Corporation and part of Jalgaon taluka of the district. The number of electors in 2009 were 308,762 (male 164,987, female 143,775).

It is part of the Jalgaon Lok Sabha constituency along with five other Vidhan Sabha segments of this district, namely Jalgaon Rural, Erandol, Amalner, Chalisgaon and Pachora.

Members of Legislative Assembly 

 1952: Kandhare Bhagwan Budhaji, Indian National Congress
 1957: Bhalerao Sadashiv Narayan, Communist Party of India
 1962: Pratibha Patil, Indian National Congress
 1967: Salunkhe T.T., Indian National Congress
 1972: Madhukar Atmaram Patil, Indian National Congress
 1978: Jain Ishwarlal Shankarlal, Indian National Congress (I)
 1980: Jain Sureshkumar Bhikamchand, Indian National Congress (I)
 1985: Jain Sureshkumar Bhikamchand, Indian Congress (Socialist)
 1990: Jain Sureshkumar Bhikamchand, Indian Congress (Socialist) – Sarat Chandra Sinha
 1995: Jain Sureshkumar Bhikamchand, Indian National Congress
 1999: Jain Sureshkumar Bhikamchand, Shiv Sena
 2004: Jain Sureshkumar Bhikamchand, Nationalist Congress Party
 2009: Jain Sureshkumar Bhikamchand, Shiv Sena
 2014: Suresh Damu Bhole, Bharatiya Janata Party
 2019: Suresh Damu Bhole, Bharatiya Janata Party

See also
 Jalgaon
 List of constituencies of Maharashtra Vidhan Sabha

References

Assembly constituencies of Maharashtra
Jalgaon